Emergency is the sixteenth studio album by the American band Kool & the Gang, released in  1984. It ultimately became the group's biggest selling career album, earning Double Platinum status in America, Platinum in Canada, and Silver in the UK.

The album produced four US top 20 hit singles including "Fresh" (US #9); "Misled" (US #10); the title track "Emergency" (US #18); and the album's biggest hit, the million-selling  "Cherish" (US #2). "Fresh",  "Misled", and "Cherish" also cracked the top 40 in the UK reaching #11, #28, and #4 respectively while "Emergency" only reached #50 in that country.

Track listing

Personnel
 Clifford Adams – trombone, background vocals
 Robert "Kool" Bell – bass, bass guitar, vocals
 Ronald Bell – synthesizer, tenor saxophone, background vocals
 George "Funky" Brown – drums
 Rick Iantosca – guitar
 Jimmy Maelen – percussion
 Robert "Spike" Mickens – trumpet
 Michael Ray – trumpet
 Charles Edward Smith – guitar
 Kendal Stubbs – bass guitar, background vocals
 James "J.T." Taylor – vocals, background vocals
 Dennis "D.T." Thomas – alto saxophone
 Curtis "Fitz" Williams – synthesizer, keyboards
 Starleana Young – background vocals
 Joe Gastwirt - Mastering

Production
 Jim Bonnefond – producer, engineer, mixing
 Ronald Bell – producer, mixing
 Brian Hagiwara – photography, cover photo
 Jose Rodriguez – mastering
 John Rollo – remixing
 Joe Roth – engineer, assistant engineer
 Kendal Stubbs – engineer, mixing
 Gabe Vigorito – coordination, mixing
 Murry Whiteman – art direction
 Joe Gastwirt - CD Mastering

Certifications

References

External links

Kool & the Gang albums
1984 albums
De-Lite Records albums